Bad Mother Trucker is an album by American punk rock band Ten Foot Pole.

Track listing
All songs written by Dennis Jagard, except "Happy Daze" and "Shelter" by Kevin Ruggeri

"Plastic" - 2:20  
"Giving Gravity A Hand" - 2:33  
"Do It Again" - 2:25  
"Happy Daze" - 2:48  
"Armchair Quarterback" - 2:16  
"Nova Scotia" - 2:34  
"Sarah Jones" - 2:30  
"One Hero" - 2:15  
"Shelter" - 2:14  
"Wanna Be Alone" - 1:54  
"Fall in Line" - 2:20  
"Riptide" - 2:56

Credits
Kevin Ruggeri - Drums, Vox, (Lead Vox on "Shelter")
John Chapman a.k.a. Johnny Smoke - Bass and Vox
Steve Carnan a.k.a. Steve Von Treetrunk - Lead Guitar
Dennis Jagard - Vox, Other Guitars.
Jim Monroe - Producer

2002 albums
Ten Foot Pole albums